Keith James Holyoak (born January 16, 1950) is a Canadian-American researcher in cognitive psychology and cognitive science, working on human thinking and reasoning. Holyoak's work focuses on the role of analogy in thinking. His work showed how analogy can be used to enhance learning of new abstract concepts by both children and adults, as well as how reasoning breaks down in cases of brain damage.

Holyoak is also a poet. He has published four collections of his own poems,  My Minotaur, Foreigner, The Gospel According to Judas, and Oracle Bones, as well as a collection of translations of classical Chinese poetry by Li Bai and Du Fu, Facing the Moon.

Biography
Holyoak was born in Langley, British Columbia, Canada, in 1950. He received his B.A. in psychology from the University of British Columbia in 1971, and his PhD in psychology from Stanford University in 1976. His doctoral advisor was Gordon Bower.

He was on the faculty of the University of Michigan from 1976 to 1986, and then joined the faculty of the University of California, Los Angeles, where he is a Distinguished Professor of Psychology.

He served as Chair of the Governing Board of the Cognitive Science Society (1994–95) and Editor of the journals Cognitive Psychology (1995–99) and Psychological Review (2016–2021).  Holyoak is a member of the American Academy of Arts and Sciences. He received a Fellowship from the John Simon Guggenheim Memorial Foundation in 1991, and a James McKeen Cattell Fellowship in 1999. He is a Fellow of the American Association for the Advancement of Science, Association for Psychological Science, the Cognitive Science Society, and the Society of Experimental Psychologists (SEP). In 2022 the SEP awarded him the Howard Crosby Warren Medal.

Books and recordings

Cognitive science 

Holyoak, K. J. (2019). The Spider’s Thread: Metaphor in Mind, Brain, and Poetry. Cambridge, Massachusetts: MIT Press, .
Holland, J.H., Holyoak, K.J., Nisbett, R.E., & Thagard, P. (1986).  Induction:  Processes of Inference, Learning, and Discovery. Cambridge, Massachusetts: MIT Press, .
 Holyoak, K.J., & Thagard, P. (1995). Mental Leaps: Analogy in Creative Thought. Cambridge, Massachusetts, MIT Press, .
 Gentner, D., Holyoak, K.J., & Kokinov, B. (Eds.) (2001). The Analogical Mind: Perspectives from Cognitive Science. Cambridge, Massachusetts: MIT Press, 
 Holyoak, K.J., & Morrison, R.G. (Eds.) (2005). The Cambridge Handbook of Thinking and Reasoning. Cambridge, UK: Cambridge University Press, 
 Holyoak, K.J., & Morrison, R.G. (Eds.) (2012). The Oxford Handbook of Thinking and Reasoning. New York, NY: Oxford University Press,

Poetry 

 Holyoak, K. (2019). Oracle Bones: Poems from the Time of Misrule.. Seattle, WA: [Goldfish Press], .
 Holyoak, K. (2015). The Gospel According to Judas. Loveland, OH: Dos Madres Press, .
 Holyoak, K. (2012). Foreigner: New English Poems in Chinese Old Style. Loveland, OH: Dos Madres Press, .
 Holyoak, K. (2010). My Minotaur: Selected Poems 1998–2006. Loveland, OH: Dos Madres Press, .
 Holyoak, K. (translator) (2007). Facing the Moon: Poems of Li Bai and Du Fu. Durham, NH: Oyster River Press, .
 Keith Holyoak's Descent. Broken Electric Records (2006).
 Poems of Li Bai. Broken Electric Records (2007).
 Poems of Du Fu. Broken Electric Records (2009).

Selected publications

 Mental leaps: Analogy in creative thought.
 Analogical problem solving
 Schema induction and analogical transfer
 Induction: Processes of Inference, Learning, and Discovery
 Pragmatic reasoning schemas
 Analogical mapping by constraint satisfaction

References

External links 
Keith Holyoak's UCLA home page
Keith Holyoak's Poetry home page
Poems at The New Formalist
 at [American Academy of Arts and Sciences]
 at [Goldfish Press]

1950 births
Living people
21st-century American psychologists
American male poets
Formalist poets
Fellows of the Society of Experimental Psychologists
Fellows of the American Association for the Advancement of Science
University of British Columbia alumni
Stanford University alumni
University of California, Los Angeles faculty
University of Michigan faculty
Fellows of the Cognitive Science Society
Academic journal editors
Psychology journal editors
20th-century American psychologists